Sweet/Vicious is an American comedy-drama television series created by Jennifer Kaytin Robinson for MTV. The series revolves around the activities of Jules and Ophelia, two college students who secretly act as vigilantes on-campus that target sexual assailants. The series tackles the emotional fallout of victimization as well as flaws in the justice system regarding reporting.

The Hollywood Reporter announced on September 8, 2015, that MTV had ordered a pilot for the series, which was originally titled Little Darlings. On December 14, 2015, Deadline Hollywood announced that MTV had given a series order to the show. On April 21, 2016, MTV announced that the series would be on their new show lineup with the final title of Sweet/Vicious.

Filming for the series began on May 4, 2016. The show premiered on MTV and the MTV app on November 15, 2016.

On April 28, 2017, MTV announced that Sweet/Vicious had been cancelled after one season.

Plot 

Jules Thomas is a preppy seeming sorority sister at Darlington University, while secretly a vigilante hunting and beating rapists on Campus. During one of her outings, Jules is attacked and nearly killed by a rapist named Carter, but is saved by Ophelia Mayer, a stoner girl living off her trust fund. After Carter is killed, Jules, despite her obvious differences from Ophelia, quickly bonds with her. Jules tells Ophelia about how Darlington has a problem with sexual violence occurring across the community, and the law refusing to do anything about it. Jules takes Ophelia under her wing and the two form a vigilante duo to go after Darlington's rapists.

It is revealed the year before that Jules was raped by Nate Griffin, the boyfriend of Jules sorority leader and best friend Kennedy. Jules is traumatized by the incident, unable to tell anyone the truth, and Nate continues to hold the incident over her head. Jules also hooks up with a boy named Tyler, before finding out he's Carter's stepbrother, and is looking for Carter. Ophelia reveals she has a strained relationship with her mother, as the two seemingly bond when Ophelia infiltrates a sorority house; said house has been making torture porn based on the sexual abuse and hazing they put new girls through. When Jules and Ophelia topple the house, Ophelia's mother leaves, showing she cared more about the sorority than actually bonding with her daughter.

Jules and Ophelia go after a serial rapist, Landon Mayes, the son of Darlington's president. The outing goes wrong when Ophelia almost gets raped and the vigilantes are caught on camera. The campus goes on lockdown, and Jules and Ophelia take to hiding in a record store along with Tyler, Nate, and Ophelia's friend Harris. During the fiasco, Jules snaps and finally confronts Nate about her rape; unfortunately, Tyler thinks there's something happening between her and Nate, and Nate goes to Kennedy confessing to "cheating" on her with Jules. With Jules having a falling out with Kennedy, she moves in with Ophelia.

Meanwhile, Harris, a law student who takes legal matters seriously, gets involved with campus security, hoping to expose the vigilantes. During a party, the attempts to expose the vigilante backfire when Jules batters a rapist to the point of near death and gets into an argument with Ophelia about letting her anger get the best of her. Nate in the meantime, manages to win Kennedy over. Despite having a falling out with Jules, Ophelia stands up for her to Kennedy by revealing Nate raped Jules. Kennedy ultimately breaks up with Nate and sides with Jules, much to Nate's ire.

It's revealed that in the year before, Jules was once friends with Nate and had to keep an eye on him at a party while Kennedy was sick. When Jules gets drunk and goes to take a nap, Nate took advantage of her and raped her. When Jules tried to report him, the administration tried to gaslight her due Nate's reputation. Witnessing how much injustice happened on campus is what put Jules on her path. In the present, Jules and Ophelia reconcile; Ophelia also reconciles with Harris; and Jules reconciles with Tyler and Kennedy. With the encouragement and help of her friends, Jules comes forward with her account, but despite evidence and testimony, the college refuses to do anything about Nate, and much of the student body takes Nate's side. To make things worse, Tyler is blamed and arrested for Carter's murder.

With Nate about to accept an award at a campus celebration, Jules and Ophelia are reached out to by Nate's friend Miles, who disowned Nate and revealed he raped one other girl in the past who was silenced. Miles helps acquire Nate's confession while the latter was on a drug fueled rant about rape victims deserving what they get. Jules and Ophelia play the recording at the ceremony, ruining Nate's reputation. Ophelia manages to frame a child molester who got off on a technicality for Carter's murder, but Tyler is still shaken up by his step brothers murder. Nate is approached by Landon Mayes, proposing they team up against the vigilantes. Harris becomes disillusioned by the law refusing to help victims to preserve Darlington's reputation, and opts to side with Jules and Ophelia. In the meantime, Jules and Ophelia are considered heroes for fighting injustice and many people reach out to them for help.

Cast

Main
 Eliza Bennett as Jules Thomas
 Taylor Dearden as Ophelia Mayer
 Brandon Mychal Smith as Harris James
 Nick Fink as Tyler Finn

Recurring
 Dylan McTee as Nate Griffin
 Aisha Dee as Kennedy Cates
 Skyler Day as Mackenzie Dalton
 Victoria Park as Gaby Cho
 Lindsay Chambers as Fiona Price
 Matt Angel as Officer Mike Veach
 Stephen Friedrich as Evan
 Greg Worswick as Barton
 Ethan Dawes as Miles Forrester
 Max Ehrich as Landon Mays
 Corinne Foxx as Rachel
 Drew Hellenthal as Tommy Cope
 James MacDonald as Officer Ballard
 Carter Jenkins as Will Powell
 Gerald Downey as Coach Howard

Episodes

Critical reception
Despite the low ratings, the show received positive reviews, and has a 100% rating on Rotten Tomatoes based on reviews from 20 critics.

References

External links
 

2016 American television series debuts
2017 American television series endings
2010s American black comedy television series
2010s American college television series
2010s American comedy-drama television series
2010s American crime drama television series
American action television series
Campus sexual assault
English-language television shows
MTV original programming
Television shows set in the United States